The 1962 Leicester North East by-election was held on 12 July 1962 when the incumbent Labour MP Sir Lynn Ungoed-Thomas was appointed a High Court Judge.  It was retained by the Labour candidate, Tom Bradley.

As a consequence of the Conservatives falling into third place behind the Liberals Harold Macmillan reshuffled his cabinet removing seven ministers, including Chancellor of the Exchequer, Selwyn Lloyd who was held responsible for the unpopularity of the pay pause policy. This mass removal of ministers, referred to as ‘the night of the long knives', smacked of desperation and caused many people to question Macmillan's political judgment.

References

By-elections to the Parliament of the United Kingdom in Leicestershire constituencies
1962 elections in the United Kingdom
1962 in England
1960s in Leicestershire